Hansruedi Kunz (born 26 May 1945) is a Swiss athlete. He competed in the men's decathlon at the 1968 Summer Olympics.

References

External links
 

1945 births
Living people
Athletes (track and field) at the 1968 Summer Olympics
Swiss decathletes
Olympic athletes of Switzerland
Sportspeople from Basel-Landschaft